Sergio Galindo (September 2, 1926 – January 3, 1993) was a Mexican novelist and short story writer.  He was born in Xalapa in the state of Veracruz, a region of Mexico that figures prominently in much of his writing.  His most widely acclaimed novels are El Bordo (“The Precipice”, 1960) and Otilia Rauda (1986), the latter filmed as La Mujer del Pueblo in 2001. Galindo studied at the Mexican National Autonomous University (UNAM) and in Paris.  He was the founder and first director of the University of Veracruz Press, where he also founded and edited the journal La Palabra y el Hombre (“The Word and the Man”).

Galindo was Director of the Palacio de Bellas Artes (National Institute of Fine Arts) from 1974 to 1976.

Prizes, honours and translations
Galindo was awarded the following prizes and honours: Honorary Officer of the Order of the British Empire, Polish award for Cultural Merit, Order of the Star of Yugoslavia, Mariano Azuela Prize, the Bellas Artes Literature Prize, the Xavier Villarrutia Prize and the José Fuentes Mares National Prize for Literature. He was elected to the Mexican Academy of the Language in 1975 and to the Spanish Royal Academy the following year. In 2006, the University of Veracruz and its International University Book Festival inaugurated an annual prize for first novels by Latin American writers, called the Premio Latinoamericano de Primera Novela Sergio Galindo. His works have been translated into English, French, Polish, German and Italian.

Novels
 Polvos de arroz (translated into English as “Rice Powder”), 1958
 La justicia de enero, 1959
 El Bordo (translated into English as “The Precipice”), 1960
 La comparsa, 1964
 Nudo, 1970
 El hombre de los hongos, 1976 (filmed in 1980)
 Los dos ángeles, 1984
 Declive, 1985
 Otilia Rauda (translated into English as “Otilia’s Body”), 1986 (filmed in 2001)

Short story collections
 La máquina vacía, 1951
 ¡Oh hermoso mundo!, 1975
 Este laberinto de hombres, 1979
 Cuentos, 1982
 Terciopelo violeta, 1985

Other writing
 Cartas a mi padre, 2007 (published posthumously)

References

External links
 International University Book Festival 
 La Palabra y el Hombre 
 La Palabra y el Hombre blog 
 Veracruz University Press 

Mexican male novelists
Mexican male short story writers
Mexican short story writers
Writers from Veracruz
Writers from Palm Springs, California
Members of the Mexican Academy of Language
1926 births
1993 deaths
20th-century Mexican male writers
20th-century Mexican novelists
20th-century short story writers
Honorary Members of the Order of the British Empire